Malta have competed at twelve Commonwealth Games, making their debut in 1958. They did not attend in 1966, 1974 or 1978, but have attended every Games since 1982. Malta have won six medals at the Games, four of these in shooting.

Medals

Medallists

| style="text-align:left; vertical-align:top;"|

References

 
Nations at the Commonwealth Games